Thomas Foster Allsop (2 September 1929 – 27 September 2019) was an Australian rules footballer who played with Hawthorn in the Victorian Football League (VFL).

Notes

External links

1929 births
2019 deaths
Australian rules footballers from Melbourne
Hawthorn Football Club players
People from the City of Boroondara